O'Donovan Rossa Bridge is a road bridge spanning the River Liffey in Dublin, Ireland, which joins Winetavern Street to Chancery Place (at the Four Courts) and the north quays.

Replacing a short-lived wooden structure, the original masonry bridge on this site was built in 1684 as a five-span simple arch bridge, and named Ormonde Bridge.  In December 1802 this bridge was swept away during a severe storm.

In 1813 construction started on a replacement bridge – the current structure – a little further west to the designs of James Savage and was opened in 1816. It consists of three elliptical arch spans in granite, with sculptured heads, similar to those on O'Connell Bridge, on the keystones. The heads represent Plenty, the Liffey, and Industry on one side, with Commerce, Hibernia and Peace on the other. The balustrades are of cast iron.

Opened as Richmond Bridge (named for Charles Lennox, 4th Duke of Richmond, Lord Lieutenant of Ireland), it was renamed in 1923 for Jeremiah O'Donovan Rossa by the fledgling Free State.

References

Bridges in Dublin (city)
Bridges completed in 1816
1816 establishments in Ireland